Muhammad Ali Tariq is a Bangladesh Nationalist Party politician and the former Member of Parliament of Jessore-5.

Career
Tariq was elected to parliament from Jessore-5 as a Bangladesh Nationalist Party candidate in 1979.

References

Bangladesh Nationalist Party politicians
Living people
2nd Jatiya Sangsad members
Year of birth missing (living people)